Anxious People is a 2021 Swedish comedy drama television series directed by Felix Herngren and based on a book of the same name by Fredrik Backman. It stars Leif Andrée, Marika Lagercrantz, Per Andersson, Lottie Ejebrant, and Anna Granath.

Synopsis
A bank robber holds up an open house, before disappearing. A father-and-son team of inept cops investigates.

Cast and characters
 Leif Andrée as Roger
 Marika Lagercrantz as Anna-Lena
 Per Andersson as Lennart
 Lottie Ejebrant as Estelle
 Anna Granath as Zarah
 Elina Du Rietz as Linda
 Dan Ekborg as Jim
 Sascha Zacharias as Liv
 Carla Sehn as Julia
 Alfred Svensson as Jack
 Petrina Solange as Ro
 Johan Berg as man in pizzeria
 Johan Eriksson as ambulance driver

References

External links
 
 

2021 Swedish television series debuts
Swedish-language Netflix original programming